Whalers Passage is a narrow channel lying between the Welcome Islands and Sky Rock, off the north coast of South Georgia. The name appears to be first used on a 1931 British Admiralty chart.

References

Straits of Antarctica